The Great British Baking Show (season 4) may refer to:

 The Great British Bake Off (series 4), broadcast as the second season of the series on PBS in the United States
 The Great British Bake Off (series 7), broadcast as the fourth season of the series on PBS in the United States

See also
 The Great British Baking Show (season 2) (disambiguation)